Daniel Soares de Sousa Lemos (born 5 January 1990), commonly known as Daniel Lemos, is a Brazilian professional footballer who plays as a forward.

Career

1. FC Ingolstadt
Lemos signed for FC Ingolstadt 04 on 1 July 2008, joining from Atlético Paranaense. He made his debut 24 August 2008 coming on as a 75th-minute substitute in Ingolstadt's 2–1 loss to RW Oberhausen.

Portimonense
Lemos signed for Segunda Liga side Portimonense SC on a free transfer from Consadole Sapporo on 1 January 2012. He made his debut on 4 February 2012 in the Taça de Portugal coming on in the 77th minute against SC Braga. He made his league debut on 12 February 2012 against Estoril, coming on in the 62nd minute.

FC Gifu
Lemos signed for FC Gifu on 17 February 2013 on a free transfer from Planaltina. He made his debut on 7 April 2013 against Kyoto Sanga FC, coming on as an 85th-minute substitute.

Lemos left FC Gifu on 25 July 2013.

ReinMeer Aomori 
On 11 August 2013, Lemos signed for Japanese Regional Leagues side ReinMeer Aomori.

Career statistics

References

External links

1990 births
Living people
Brazilian footballers
J2 League players
Segunda Divisão players
Hokkaido Consadole Sapporo players
FC Gifu players
Operário Ferroviário Esporte Clube players
Portimonense S.C. players
Brazilian expatriate footballers
Expatriate footballers in Portugal
Expatriate footballers in Japan
Association football forwards
Sportspeople from Federal District (Brazil)